The Tragedy Of Sertorius is a 1679 tragedy by the English writer John Bancroft. It was first performed by the King's Company at the Theatre Royal, Drury Lane. The original cast are unknown. It is based on the life of Quintus Sertorius who led a rebellion against the Roman Republic.

References

Bibliography
 Depledge, Emma Shakespeare's Rise to Cultural Prominence: Politics, Print and Alteration, 1642–1700. Cambridge University Press, 2018.
 Van Lennep, W. The London Stage, 1660-1800: Volume One, 1660-1700. Southern Illinois University Press, 1960.

1679 plays
English plays
West End plays
Tragedy plays
Biographical plays about military leaders
Plays set in ancient Rome
Plays set in the 1st century BC